Frades is a municipality of northwestern Spain in the province of A Coruña, in the autonomous community of Galicia. It belongs to the comarca of Órdenes. Frades is situated in the central zone of the province. One of the most popular sites in Frades is the Aiazo village and its parklands next to the Tambre river.

References

Municipalities in the Province of A Coruña